TFMFly is a compound related to psychedelic phenethylamines such as 2C-B-FLY and 2C-TFM. It was first reported in 2005 by a team at Purdue University led by David Nichols. It acts as a potent agonist at the 5HT2A serotonin receptor subtype, and is a chiral compound with the more active (R) enantiomer having a Ki of 0.12 nM at the human 5HT2A receptor. While the fully aromatic benzodifurans such as Bromo-DragonFLY generally have higher binding affinity than saturated compounds like 2C-B-FLY, the saturated compounds have higher efficacy as agonists.

Legal Status
TFMFly is illegal in Latvia.

See also
 2C-E-FLY
 Bromo-dragonfly
 DOB-FLY

References 

Serotonin receptor agonists
Trifluoromethyl compounds
Heterocyclic compounds with 3 rings
Oxygen heterocycles
Amines